is a Japanese video game developed by Technosoft and released in 1993. It is a horizontally scrolling shooter which takes inspiration from the Thunder Force series. The game has the player take control of a ship that can transform between a humanoid mecha and a space ship. The game was released in arcades in 1993, running on the TEC442-A hardware, then was ported to the Sega Saturn in 1996. It has never been released outside of Japan.

Gameplay 

The Buster Gears are fighter spaceships with various upgradeable weapons systems in the "Fighter" mode, but they can transform into an "Armor" mode, a humanoid warrior robot with several heavy fire arms. The Fighter mode is easily maneuverable, small, and fast; it also shoots straight in front of it. The Armor mode, on the other hand, is slower, bigger, and less responsive; it is capable of shooting up and down at a 45 degree angle, as well as straight. The firepower of the Armor mode is also superior. The weaponry of both modes can be upgraded by collecting P items which appear from defeating enemies. The ships can also acquire helper units by collecting either the T or G items. The Tracer unit is similar to the Fighter mode and it shoots forward when closing in on an enemy, while the Gunner unit is similar to the Armor mode and it homes on enemies. Both units also act as destructible shields.

Buster Gears change mode by pressing the alternate button. There are two buttons, one for the Fighter mode and one for the Armor mode. Pressing both buttons results in the activation of a special attack, involving two units that appear above and below the Buster Gear. In Fighter mode, they are stationary and shoot in a circular manner. In Armor mode, the units rotate around the ship and provide forward cover fire. This special attack depletes the special attack meter and when it runs out, the units stop firing. The meter is filled up by unit inactivity and by collecting B items.

Gameplay is similar to other Technosoft scrolling shooters, particularly the Thunder Force series. There are 8 stages in total. Stages consist of traveling through a scenario infested with enemies, which drop the various items aforementioned. Sometimes, there are minibosses, but there is always a rather large boss at the end of the stage. Defeating these bosses requires quick reactions and exploiting an inherent weakness. Enemies that are defeated yield points and upon completing a stage, several point bonuses are awarded. Extra lives are gained by acquiring a certain number of points. Unique to Hyper Duel is a ranking system, based upon how many P items have been acquired. The higher the number of upgrades the Buster Gear collects, the higher the number of bullets and shots on the screen.

The Saturn version contains an original "Arcade Mode," a practically arcade-perfect conversion of the original, as well as an updated "Saturn Mode." In addition to including a new 3D opening cinematic, Saturn Mode also has cleaner, brighter, and more detailed sprites and backgrounds, even redrawn in some cases. The character select screen features 3D models of the Buster Gears. Certain animations are also smoother and redone to seem more 3D, particularly for the first boss. There are also some enhancements on the gameplay. For example, the Armor mode can lock its aim with the addition of a new button, allowing for independent aiming, a feature that was not present in the arcade version. Certain aspects of the game were also made harder. Overall, the Saturn version has more features. While the original arcade soundtrack used the native sound equipment of the arcade machine, the Saturn version boasts an arranged soundtrack that is CD quality.

Plot 
A moon base operated by the Joint Space Force discovered mechanical remains from an alien civilization in the rock beneath. The Force proceeded to adapt this discovery to create a new, extremely powerful weapon: transforming fighters known as Buster Gears. However, before the final test of the prototypes, terrorists and one of the project's scientists stole Unit 0 "Black Angel". Now, the other three ready Buster Gears have been commissioned to break through the terrorist forces and either recover or destroy Black Angel.

Development and release 
The music of Hyper Duel was composed by Hyakutaro Tsukumo of Thunder Force V fame.

It was originally released in 1993 for the arcade in Japan; it was later released for the Sega Saturn console on November 22, 1996 in Japan only. After launch, it was showcased in a playable state to attendees at the 1994 AMOA show.

On May 1, 1997, the Saturn soundtrack was released by Technosoft in the album “Technosoft Game Music Collection Vol. 6: Sanctuary.” Included were also four Thunder Force III arranges. On March 28, 2006, the soundtrack saw another release in the Factory Noise & AG album "Absolute Area -project Thunder Force VI-." The Saturn tracks were remastered and packaged with several new arranges, as well a Thunder Force III arrange. The Saturn version has become a rare game for collectors. Eurogamer in 2014 listed the game as costing £150 - £220 in the United Kingdom.

Reception 

Famitsu gave the Saturn version a score of 22 out of 40. A reviewer from French magazine Joypad regarded the Saturn version as an "excellent shoot 'em up".

Notes

References

External links 

 Hyper Duel at GameFAQs
 Hyper Duel at MobyGames

1993 video games
Arcade video games
Cooperative video games
Horizontally scrolling shooters
Japan-exclusive video games
Multiplayer and single-player video games
Sega Saturn games
Technosoft games
Video games about mecha
Video games about terrorism
Video games developed in Japan
Video games featuring female protagonists